Douglas Clark Teper (born November 22, 1958) is an American politician and businessman from the U.S. state of Georgia.

Teper was born in Atlanta, Georgia and graduated from the Georgia State University in 1982. He worked for a consulting company, in Atlanta, Georgia, and was the chief executive officer. From 1988 to 2004, Teper served in the Georgia House of Representatives and was a Democrat.

References

1958 births
Living people
Businesspeople from Atlanta
Politicians from Atlanta
Georgia State University alumni
Democratic Party members of the Georgia House of Representatives